Teaching Sociology is a quarterly academic journal in the field of sociology. It has been published since 1973 by American Sociological Association. The journal's goal is to publicize both theoretical and practical information useful for professionals teaching sociology courses.

History
Teaching Sociology incorporates Teaching Newsletter (1979–1985), which was formerly named On Teaching Undergraduate Sociology Newsletter (197?-1979).

External links
 Home page

Publications established in 1973
Education journals
Sociology journals
Quarterly journals
SAGE Publishing academic journals
American Sociological Association academic journals